Deutsch is a lunar impact crater on the far side of the Moon. It lies to the southwest of the larger crater Seyfert. About one crater to the east-northeast is Polzunov.

Its name comes from Armin Joseph Deutsch, an American astronomer and science-fiction author.

This crater has a relatively low, eroded rim that is heavily damaged along the southeastern section. This portion is overlain by Deutsch F along the east and Deutsch L to the south, with an irregular region between these two formations. The interior floor of Deutsch is relatively level, but is marked by a number of small impacts.

A ray from Giordano Bruno to the north-northwest passes along the western edge of Deutsch.

Satellite craters
By convention these features are identified on lunar maps by placing the letter on the side of the crater midpoint that is closest to Deutsch.

References

 
 
 
 
 
 
 
 
 
 
 
 

Impact craters on the Moon